Svetlana Klyuchnikova  (born 27 June 1984) is a Kazakh rugby union player. She was a member of the Kazakhstan women's national rugby union team. She won a gold medal at 2010 Asian Games.

Career 
She competed at the 2010 Women's Rugby World Cup, 2014 Women's Rugby World Cup, and 2021 Rugby World Cup qualifying.

She competed in rugby sevens at the 2014 Asian Games and 2018 Asian Games.

References

External links 
 Klyuchnikova Svetlana #9 of Kazakhstan kicks the ball as Ano Kuwai #11 of Japan attempts to charge down

1984 births
Rugby union players
Rugby sevens players
Living people
Rugby union players at the 2010 Asian Games
Rugby union players at the 2014 Asian Games
Rugby union players at the 2018 Asian Games
Asian Games gold medalists for Kazakhstan
Asian Games bronze medalists for Kazakhstan
Medalists at the 2010 Asian Games
Medalists at the 2014 Asian Games
Medalists at the 2018 Asian Games
21st-century Kazakhstani women